Trulte Heide Steen (a.k.a. Anne Katrine Heide Steen, born 1943) is a Norwegian actress and singer.

Family
Heide Steen is the daughter of the actor Harald Heide Steen, the sister of the actor Harald Heide-Steen Jr., and the cousin of the actress Anne Marit Jacobsen.

Career
In addition to playing minor roles in films and TV series, Heide Steen started singing at the Lysthuset revue theater after Karin Krog returned to jazz singing. In 1979 she released the jazz album Smålåtfolket together with Dag Åkeson Moe. In 2003 she participated together with her brother Harald Heide Steen Jr. in NRK's Saturday game show Hodejegerne (The Headhunters).

Filmography
1959: 5 loddrett as Mette Jespersen, Knut and Randi's elder daughter
1961: Et øye på hver finger as Maja Allnes
1968: De ukjentes marked

Television
1966: Kontorsjef Tangen (series)
2003: Hodejegerne (game show)

References

External links
 
 Trulte Heide Steen at Sceneweb

1943 births
Living people
Actresses from Oslo
20th-century Norwegian actresses
Norwegian women jazz singers